The Flagey Building  also known as the Radio House is a building located in Ixelles, a municipality of Brussels, Belgium, housing the Flagey cultural centre. It is located on the south-western corner of Place Eugène Flagey/Eugène Flageyplein, with its main entrance on the /.

The building, parts of which are listed, was designed by the architect  and completed in 1938 in Streamline Moderne, an international style of Art Deco. It served as the former headquarters of the Belgian National Institute of Radio Broadcasting (INR/NIR). When the broadcaster left in 1974, the building was refurbished as a cultural community centre.

History

The Flagey Building, designed by Joseph Diongre after winning a competition launched in 1933, was opened in 1938. The competition was launched to create a building to house the first national broadcaster in Belgium, the National Institute of Radio Broadcasting ( or INR,  or NIR) (1930–1960). Henry van de Velde and Victor Horta were on the jury that awarded the prize to Diongre.

The building owes its name to Eugène Flagey, a Belgian lawyer and politician who served as mayor of Ixelles from 1935 to 1953. It is designed in Streamline Moderne, an international style of Art Deco, also known as style paquebot ("ocean liner style") in France. Owing to its shape somewhat resembling a ship, the building is nicknamed "Packet Boat" or "paquebot". The interiors included much wood panelling and thin tube lamps, typical of the style.

The building garnered critical acclaim as soon as it was finished, and the qualities of the studios attracted renowned classical, contemporary and jazz musicians to perform there (including Chuck Berry, Jerry Lee Lewis and Chet Baker), for live concerts and recordings.

The INR/NIR was later split into separate broadcasting entities, one for each language, the Dutch-language VRT and the French-speaking RTBF, before they moved out of the building completely in 1974 (after growing out of it) and leased it to various other cultural bodies until the late 1990s. During this time, it was poorly maintained. In 1997, a working group convened to create a feasibility study for a complete renovation of the building.

Established as a public limited company (société anonyme), the consortium Maison de la Radio Flagey (NV Omroepgebouw Flagey) purchased the building from the VRT and RTBF on 30 June 1998, with 30 companies working towards saving the building. The building was extensively renovated by architects including Storme Van Ranst, and was reopened in 2002.

Description

The building occupies a large site in the south-western corner of the square, with its main entrance on the Place Sainte-Croix. A number of trams and buses provide transport to the location.

As a non-profit organisation Le Flagey has the following aims:
 to create a cultural pole in Brussels, open to diverse musical styles, offering a large part to the image of different artistic disciplines;
 to create an architectural and real-estate pole by safeguarding and reallocating the former building of the RTBF;
 to create a pole at the social level by demonstrating a joint action by representatives of the country's different communities with a view to creating a cultural institution of excellence with a European vocation. It also located in between the upmarket Ixelles Ponds and the world of immigrant cultures.

The central portion of the building is dedicated to cultural activities, with five recording studios that are flexible in size and function. Part of the building is listed as a protected monument by the Monuments and Sites Directorate of the Brussels-Capital Region.

Recording studios

The original design incorporated twelve recording studios, which were built in two acoustic towers forming the core of the building. The 2002 renovation restored the Flagey Building's original functions by creating a musical space with recording studios and concerts venues, allowing it to host an eclectic programme of events.

Its Studio 4 is one of the concert halls with the best acoustics worldwide, home to the Brussels Philharmonic. The whole back wall is occupied by an organ, specially designed for this space and built by the Tournai organ-builder Maurice Delmotte. Studio 4 is also used as a recording studio. The award-winning soundtrack, released in 2005 for Martin Scorsese's 2004 film The Aviator, was recorded there, as well as the musical score of the award-winning movie The Artist in 2011.

Events

Cinema
The centre has a room permanently dedicated to cinema. It screens films programmed by CINEMATEK, usually classic films or recent curiosities that have not been distributed in the commercial network. Exceptional screenings are sometimes organised in the prestigious concert hall, the largest in Brussels, where a huge screen is installed for the event. In 2003, Playtime by Jacques Tati was screened there in its original version in 70 mm, for the first time in Belgium.

The Brussels Short Film Festival (BSFF) uses Flagey as one of its locations for screenings and other events. The festival then named the Brussels European Film Festival, later the Brussels Film Festival (BRFF), took place in April, and a series known as Spanish and Latin American Cinema took place in November, as of 2012. The first edition of the Brussels International Film Festival (BRIFF) took place in the building in 2018.

Music
Aside from being home to the Brussels Philharmonic, the centre hosts Flagey Piano Days (featuring US pianist Stephen Kovacevich in 2017), and the Brussels Jazz Festival has taken place there since 2015. Flagey is also home to other jazz events, such as the Brussels Jazz Marathon and the Brussels Jazz Platform.

See also

 Art Deco in Brussels

References

External links

 

Ixelles
Buildings and structures completed in 1938
Art Deco architecture in Belgium
Cinemas in Belgium
Music venues in Belgium